Cision Ltd. is a public relations and earned media software company and services provider. The company is incorporated in the Cayman Islands and headquartered in Chicago, Illinois; with clients worldwide. The company went public via reverse merger in June 2017. In addition to its web-based PR and earned media software as a service (SaaS) suite the Cision Communications Cloud, the company owns online publicity and media services PRNewswire, PRWeb, Bulletin Intelligence, L'Argus de la presse, Help a Reporter Out (HARO), CEDROM-SNI, Prime Research, and Canada Newswire. The company operates in the United States, Canada, Europe and Asia.

Company is led by Brandon Crawley, Interim CEO & Managing Director Platinum Equity.

Products and services
Cision provides public relations services to businesses, using a cloud-based, or software as a service (SaaS) model. The company offers social media monitoring and engagement and media publicity services.

Cision's software is distributed in seven languages. , it is used by more than 16,000 annual subscribers worldwide, including commercial businesses and governmental, educational and non-profit organizations.

Software
The company offers three web-based packages: the "CisionMarketing Suite", the "Public Relations Suite" and a "Government Relations and Political Action Committee Suite". The Cision "Public Relations Suite" allows users to distribute press releases, access a database of bloggers and journalists (with no option to opt-out), and monitor and analyze news and social media sites. The company's "Government Relations Suite" manages government contacts, analyzes lobbying activity, facilitates communication with elected officials and provides PAC compliance software for filing reports to the FEC and state elections commissions.

Services

Through a series of acquisitions, the company provides services in PRWeb, HARO, North Social, Eureka, and Media Insight Suite which Cision has continued to operate under the existing brand names. Vocus also offers consulting services to support the use of its software products.

PRWeb is an online press release service. PRWeb services are available through the "Vocus Marketing Suite," the "Vocus PR Suite" or as a separate service.

History
In 2011, Cision AB sold its Finnish subsidiary Oy Cision Finland AB to M-Brain Group.

On September 15, 2014, Cision announced the acquisition of Visible Technologies, a social media analytics company.

On October 14, 2014, Cision AB and Vocus announced a "friendly merger" of the two public relations companies. Cision based in Sweden will relocate its headquarters to Chicago and so will Vocus from Maryland, United States. The company will be based out of Chicago and the combined entity will be known as Cision.

During 2015, Cision also acquired UK company Gorkana. Gorkana offered monitoring, journalist database and analysis services.

On December 15, 2015, Cision agreed to acquire PRNewswire from UBM plc for $841 million (approx. £575 million).

On June 29, 2017, Cision went public via its reverse merger with special purpose acquisition company Capitol Acquisition Corporation III.

On December 26, 2017, Cision agreed to acquire PRIME Research. The acquisition was completed on January 24, 2018.

On January 31, 2020, Platinum Equity completed its acquisition of Cision Ltd for $2.7 billion making it private again. 

In September 2020, Cision named Abel Clark as CEO, replacing interim chief Brandon Crawley. Prior to the appointment, Clark was CEO of TruSight.

Cision announced the acquisition of Brandwatch in February 2021 for $450 million.

Brandon Crawley returned as interim CEO in February 2022.

In April 2022, Cision acquired Streem, an Australia-based realtime media monitoring company.

In November 2022, Cision acquired Factmata, a media monitoring and analytics technology company.

In January 2023, Cali Tran joined as CEO.

See also
Viralheat
Vocus (software)

References

External links
 

Companies based in Chicago
Marketing companies established in 1867
Companies formerly listed on the New York Stock Exchange
Public relations companies of the United States
Multinational companies headquartered in the United States
Press release agencies
News agencies based in the United States
Private equity portfolio companies
Special-purpose acquisition companies
Offshore companies of the Cayman Islands